Blake Butler (born 1979) is an American writer and editor. He edits the literature blog HTMLGIANT, and two journals: Lamination Colony, and concurrently with co-editor Ken Baumann, No Colony. His other writing has appeared in Birkensnake, The Believer, Unsaid, Fence, Willow Springs, The Lifted Brow, Opium Magazine, Gigantic and Black Warrior Review. He also wrote a regular column for Vice Magazine.

Butler attended Georgia Tech, where he majored in multi-media design. He went on to Bennington College for his Master of Fine Arts.

Commentary on his works
Publishers Weekly has called him "an endlessly surprising, funny, and subversive writer". About There Is No Year, Library Journal says, "This artfully crafted, stunning piece of nontraditional literature is recommended for contemporary literature fans looking for something out of the ordinary. Butler integrates unusual elements into his novel, such as interview-style monologs and in later chapters poetry-like stanzas. Also recommended for students of literature, psychology, and philosophy, as the distinctive writing style and creative insight into the minds of one family deserve analysis.  Kirkus Reviews says, "For those who like their prose fresh out of a cleaner and more traditional wellspring, Blake's writing can prove tedious at best and arduous at worst. But for those who lean toward writing that is more visceral, taxing or outright demanding of the reader, this might be the right cup of tea..."

Bibliography
Ever (novella) (Calamari Press, 2009)
Scorch Atlas (novel-in-stories) (Featherproof Books, 2010)
There Is No Year (novel) (Harper Perennial, 2011)    
Nothing: A Portrait of Insomnia (memoir) (Harper Perennial, 2011) 
Sky Saw (novel) (Tyrant Books, 2012)
One (novel) (Roof Books, 2012)
300,000,000 (novel) (Harper Perennial, 2014)
Alice Knott (novel) (Penguin Random House, 2020)
Aannex (novel) (Apocalypse Party, 2022)
Molly (memoir) (Archway Editions, 2023)
UXA.GOV (novel) (Inside the Castle, 2024)

References

External links
 Butler's weblog "Gilles Deleuze Committed Suicide and So Will Dr. Phil"
 weblog "HTMLGiant"

21st-century American novelists
Living people
1979 births
Georgia Tech alumni
American male novelists
21st-century American male writers
Bennington College alumni